Lendakaris Muertos are a punk rock band formed in Pamplona, Spain in 2004. The band is known for their orthodox punk, with fast and short tunes, usually dealing in an ironic way about the social problems in the Basque Country and Spain. The band's name (Dead Lendakaris in Spanish) is inspired by the American band Dead Kennedys.

Members
Aitor Ibarretxe - Vocals
Asier Aguirre - Guitar and backing vocals
Txema Garaikoetxea - Bass and backing vocals
Potxeta Ardanza - Drums

Discography
Albums
 Lendakaris Muertos (2005)
 Se habla español (2006)
 Vine, vi y me vendí (2008)
 Crucificados por el antisistema (2012)
 Cicatriz en la matrix (2016)
 Podrán Cortar la Droga Pero No la Primavera (2017)

Live albums
 Directo a los güevos (2009)

Tapes
 Lendakaris Muertos (2004)

External links
Official website

Basque music
Spanish punk rock groups
Musical groups established in 2004